Allendorf Airport  is a public airport located  north of Allendorf (Eder) in Hesse, Germany, run by the energy company Viessmann.

The airport was upgraded in 2005 at a cost of €10 million.

See also

 Transport in Germany
 List of airports in Germany

External links
  
 Allendorf Airport at World Aero Data

Airports in Hesse